Georg, Prince of Saxe-Meiningen (11 October 1892 – 6 January 1946) was the head of the house of Saxe-Meiningen from 1941 until his death.

Biography

He was born in Kassel the eldest son of Prince Frederick Johann of Saxe-Meiningen (1861-1914) and Countess Adelaide of Lippe-Biesterfeld (1870–1948). His father was a son of Georg II, Duke of Saxe-Meiningen and his mother a daughter of Count Ernst of Lippe-Biesterfeld. Georg studied law at the Universities of Munich and Jena.

Georg suspended his studies to serve in World War I and saw action as a Captain in a cavalry regiment. His uncle Bernhard III abdicated on 10 November 1918 following the German Revolution as the German monarchies were abolished. After the war he resumed his law studies and for a time served as a substitute judge for the town of Hildburghausen in the Free State of Thuringia. On 1 May 1933 he joined the Nazis, becoming NSDAP member (# 2.594.794).

After the death of his uncle Ernst on 29 December 1941, Georg succeeded to the headship of the house of Saxe-Meiningen and assumed the title of Duke of Saxe-Meiningen and style Georg III.

Georg died in the Russian prisoner of war camp near Cherepovets (Tscherepowetz in German) in Northern Russia. His heir was his second and only surviving son Prince Frederick Alfred who renounced the succession, being a monk in 1953, allowing it to pass to his uncle Bernhard.

Marriage and children
He was married in Freiburg im Breisgau on 22 February 1919 to Countess Klara Marie von Korff genannt Schmissing-Kerssenbrock (Darmstadt, 31 May 1895 - Högerhof bei Türnitz, Lower Austria, 10 February 1992). They had four children:

Ancestry

References

1892 births
1946 deaths
German prisoners of war in World War II held by the Soviet Union
Nobility from Kassel
Princes of Saxe-Meiningen
Royalty in the Nazi Party
German people who died in Soviet detention
Nazis who died in prison custody